Events from the year 1514 in art.

Events
Raphael's friend, courtier Giovanbattista Branconio dell'Aquila, becomes the personal keeper of Hanno, the white elephant brought to Rome in 1514.

Works

 Hans Baldung – Portrait of a Man
 Giovanni Bellini – The Feast of the Gods (in original form)
 Vittore Carpaccio
 St. Vitale on horseback and other saints
 The Sermon of St. Stephen
 Lucas Cranach the Elder
The Judgement of Paris (1512-14)
Madonna with Child with Young John the Baptist
Portraits of Henry IV of Saxony and Catherine of Mecklenburg
 Albrecht Dürer – Engravings
 Melancholia I
 Saint Jerome in His Study
 Quentin Matsys – The Moneylender and his Wife
 Raphael – some dates approximate
 Madonna dell'Impannata
 Madonna della seggiola
 Madonna della tenda
 Portrait of a Young Man
 Sibyls (fresco in Santa Maria della Pace, Rome)
 Sistine Madonna
 (with Giulio Romano) –  (Frescos in Raphael Rooms of the Apostolic Palace in the Vatican)
 Deliverance of Saint Peter
 The Fire in the Borgo
 The Mass at Bolsena
 The Meeting of Leo the Great and Attila
 Titian –  approximate dates
 Balbi Holy Conversation
 Sacred and Profane Love

Births
Cornelis Floris de Vriendt, Flemish Renaissance architect and sculptor (died 1575)
Virgil Solis, German draughtsman and printmaker in engraving, etching and woodcut (died 1562)

Deaths
date unknown
 Andrea di Niccolò - Italian painter of the Sienese School (born 1440)
 Georg Glockendon, woodblock cutter, printer and painter (date of birth unknown)
probable
Giovanni Dalmata, Dalmatian sculptor (born 1440)
Francisco de Osona, Spanish Renaissance painter (born 1465)

References

 
Years of the 16th century in art